Darkchylde is an American comic book character created in 1996 by Randy Queen. It was originally published by Maximum Press, and later by Image Comics, through Homage Comics, a publishing imprint of Wildstorm. Subsequent projects would be published by Darkchylde Entertainment, through Wowio.

Darkchylde is the story of Ariel Chylde, a cursed teen who can become the creatures from her many nightmares, and then must save her small town from the forces of darkness she's set free.

Publication history
Darkchylde was launched as a comic book property to immediate success in the summer of 1996. The book shot to the #1 hottest comics spot in Wizard, where it stayed for nine months collectively in both Wizard and Combo magazines. The book outsold Spider-Man, the Hulk, Superman, and Batman in America, and quickly garnered an unusually large female following, in stark contrast to the traditionally male comic book market. The success of the books spawned a line of best-selling trading cards, action figures, skateboards, lunch-boxes, lithos, apparel, and mini-bust statues.

When the book was launched overseas to foreign audiences, it quickly became Panini Publishing's best selling title, overselling all of their classic superhero titles, including both Spider-Man and the X-Men.

Wizard magazine released Darkchylde #1/2, a mail order-only comic that outsold all of their previous mail order comics.

Creator Randy Queen created Darkchylde Entertainment with partner Sarah Oates and launched Dreams of the Darkchylde #1. It was the best-selling independent title offered that month in Previews, the magazine for comic distribution orders.

In a second interview with Nicholas Yanes from scifipulse.net Queen revealed that Darkchylde would appear in a published comic book after several years of absence. This comic book would be a one-shot crossover titled The Darkness/ Darkchylde: Kingdom Pain, released in December 2009. In addition to containing a new story feature Darkchylde, this one-shot also contained preview art for Randy Queen's next comic book title "Starfall".

Manga Darkchylde

In 2005 the title was relaunched at Dark Horse Comics as Manga Darkchylde, with Ariel now being a little girl. The term manga in the title is somewhat misleading, as the new series is clearly not a manga in the traditional sense and actually bears very little resemblance to Japanese manga in any way. Only using the base elements of the original Darkchylde, Randy Queen is now expanding his "Darkchylde-universe".

Issues
Darkchylde comic books, in order of reading: 
Darkchylde Diary
Darkchylde #1–5
Spawn #56 (4-page Darkchylde interlude featuring Flatulance)
Darkchylde #0
Darkchylde ½
Darkchylde: The Legacy #1–3
Darkchylde: Redemption ½, #1,2
Dreams of the Darkchylde #1–6
Darkchylde Last Issue Special
Painkiller Jane/Darkchylde (drawn by J. G. Jones)
Witchblade/Darkchylde
The Darkness/Darkchylde: Kingdom of Pain
Darkchylde Swimsuit Illustrated
Darkchylde Summer Swimsuit Spectacular
Darkchylde Sketchbook
Manga Darkchylde #0, 1–2

Collected editions
Some of the comics have been collected into trade paperbacks:
Darkchylde: The Descent  (collects the original miniseries and the Spawn interlude, WildStorm/Homage Comics, 1998)
Darkchylde, Volume 1: Legacy and Redemption (Collects Darkchylde: Legacy #1/2 & 1-3, and Darkchylde: Redemption #1/2 & 1, 2) (160 pages, January 2011)
Darkchylde: Dreams of Darkchylde (Collects Dreams of the Darkchylde #1-6) (June 2011)

Adaptations

Novel
Darkchylde was turned into a Young Adult Novel by Andrea Brown Literary Agency.
Queen completed the first of a series of long awaited novels titled Darkchylde: The Ariel Chylde Saga in 2015.

Film
In August 2007 creator Randy Queen revealed to Newsarama that a movie was in the works.

In an interview with Nicholas Yanes from scifipulse.net, Randy Queen was asked and responded to a question about a film/television adaptation of Darkchylde:

Test footage from the set of Darkchylde emerged in July 2010 and on October 31, John Carpenter was hired to direct. The project has since seen no further comment from Carpenter or Queen, and is believed to be in development hell or shelved by the production company.

Tumblr depictions and subsequent DMCA takedown notices
In August 2014, Randy Queen, owner of the character, filed numerous DMCA Takedown Requests regarding Escher Girls, a Tumblr blog which critiques the anatomical inaccuracies of women featured in comic art.  The notices were filed in response to posts critical of Queen's work, specifically a piece of art published on the blog nine times with encouragement for others to correct it with redraws - a piece of art created 18 years ago while the artist was still learning. Queen felt his work was being used in an abusive and misleading manner, and exercised due process with Tumblr in having his copyrighted images removed from the blog. Tumblr erroneously removed the entire post, which included commentary. Subsequently, Queen apologized on his Facebook page regarding the incident and asked Tumblr to restore the content, which they did.

Notes

External links
 

1996 comics debuts
Comics characters introduced in 1996
Dark Horse Comics characters
Dark Horse Comics titles
Maximum Press titles
Fantasy comics
Horror comics